Simeon Wagoner House is a historic home located near Gibsonville, Guilford County, North Carolina. It was built in 1861, and is a two-story, three bay, single-pile, Italianate style brick dwelling.  It has distinctive recessed panels and corbelling, a two-story rear ell, and Greek Revival style interior.  Also on the property is the contributing hip-roofed, brick dairy.

It was listed on the National Register of Historic Places in 1991.

References

Houses on the National Register of Historic Places in North Carolina
Italianate architecture in North Carolina
Greek Revival houses in North Carolina
Houses completed in 1861
Houses in Guilford County, North Carolina
National Register of Historic Places in Guilford County, North Carolina
1861 establishments in North Carolina